Donacaula roscidellus, the brown donacaula moth, is a moth in the family Crambidae. It was described by Harrison Gray Dyar Jr. in 1917. It is found in Mexico (Veracruz) and the United States, where it has been recorded from Florida, Kentucky, Louisiana, Mississippi and Texas.

The length of the forewings is 18–30 mm. The forewings are light brown and the hindwings are glossy white. Adults have been recorded on wing from February to November.

References

Moths described in 1917
Schoenobiinae